Edward Cyril McDonald (October 28, 1886 – March 11, 1946) was a professional baseball player. He was a third baseman over parts of three seasons (1911–13) with the Boston Rustlers/Braves and Chicago Cubs. For his career, he compiled a .244 batting average, with three home runs and 54 runs batted in.

He was born and later died in Albany, New York at the age of 59.

External links

1886 births
1946 deaths
Sportspeople from Albany, New York
Boston Rustlers players
Boston Braves players
Chicago Cubs players
Major League Baseball third basemen
Baseball players from New York (state)
Albany Senators players
New Bedford Whalers (baseball) players
Lawrence Colts players
Scranton Miners players
Newark Sailors players
Rochester Bronchos players
Toronto Maple Leafs (International League) players
Buffalo Bisons (minor league) players
Birmingham Barons players
Atlanta Crackers players
Indianapolis Indians players
Chattanooga Lookouts players
Chattanooga Lookouts managers
Burials at St. Agnes Cemetery